HMS Dido was an  protected cruiser built for the Royal Navy in the mid-1890s.

Design
Eclipse-class second-class protected cruisers were preceded by the shorter Astraea-class cruisers. Dido had a displacement of  when at normal load. It was powered by two inverted triple-expansion steam engines which used steam from eight cylindrical boilers.

It carried five 40-calibre  quick-firing (QF) guns in single mounts protected by gun shields. One gun was mounted on the forecastle, two on the quarterdeck and one pair was abreast the bridge. The secondary armament consisted of six 40-calibre  guns; three on each broadside. It was fitted with three 18-inch torpedo tubes, one submerged tube on each broadside and one above water in the stern. Its ammunition supply consisted of 200 six-inch rounds per gun, 250 shells for each 4.7-inch gun, 300 rounds per gun for the s and 500 for each three-pounder. Dido had ten torpedoes, presumably four for each broadside tube and two for the stern tube.

Construction
Dido was laid down at London and Glasgow Shipbuilding Company's Govan, Glasgow shipyard on 30 August 1894. An initial attempt to launch the ship on 18 March 1896 proved unsuccessful, with the ship sticking on the slipway, but a second attempt on 20 March proved successful, with the ship being completed on 10 May 1898, at a cost of £252,278.

Operational history
While serving in the Mediterranean she cruised Greek waters in March 1900. She was later posted to the China Station. In October 1901 she left Hong Kong homebound, arriving at Sheerness 14 December. She paid off at Chatham on 11 January 1902 and was placed in the Fleet Reserve as an emergency ship.

It was more than a year until she was commissioned again in February 1903 with the crew of the HMS Galatea, succeeding her as coast guard ship at Humber district based at Hull.

She received a Le Cheminant chronometer from the Royal Observatory on 17 March 1916.

Footnotes

References

 

Eclipse-class cruisers
Ships built in Govan
1896 ships